MCC Higher Secondary School (full name: Madras Christian College Higher Secondary School) is located in Chetpet, Chennai, Tamil Nadu, India. It was founded in 1835 and has a long, and illustrious history, including having produced many citizens of note. It is also known for its large campus in the center of the city, with large playgrounds, verdant gardens, and various facilities.

The school in its current form, was an offshoot of the Madras Christian College, and became a separate entity when the college moved to a new location.

The school is part of an exchange program by the United States Department of State.

History

Founding 
MCC School has its roots in a small school for boys established in 1835 when two chaplains of the Church of Scotland in Madras, Rev. George James Laurie and Rev. Matthew Bowie founded the St. Andrew's School on Randalls Road in Egmore, Madras. At their request, the Church of Scotland sent a missionary to India to govern it. Missionary Rev. John Anderson, set up the institution as the General Assembly School, conducting classes in a rented house on the east side of Armenian Street in Georgetown, Madras. The headmaster and 59 boys from St. Andrew's School moved to this institution. It was named after the supreme governing body of the Church of Scotland and aimed at attracting students from the Hindu higher castes with the aim of "conveying as great as an amount of truth as possible through the channel of a good education especially of Bible truth".

Headmasters and their Contributions 

Rev. Dr. William Miller took over in 1862. The School which until then was going through rough weather grew into a college too. The college (MCC College) was founded in a 375-acre (1.52 km2) wooded campus under his leadership. He who created hostels and several academic and cultural associations, and this shaped MCC into a premier educational institution in South Asia.

In 1877, the school got its present name “Madras Christian College”. The school grew in strength and reputation, an the curriculum was updated and made more comprehensive.

In the course of time, it became clear that the school should move to a larger, quieter, and healthier site; and the effort to move the school to a new locale was intensified by Mr. Kuruvilla Jacob who became the Head Master in 1931. The present site at Chetpet, then called Napier Garden was purchased, and the school moved into the newly constructed building in the year 1950.

It was during Mr. Kuruvilla Jacob's time that the school reached its peak of excellence in both curricular and extra-curricular activities.

In 1962 Mr. Matthias took over as Headmaster. He formed the first Parent-Teacher Association. With the help of the association and other friends Mr. Mathisas added the seventh standard block, equipped the laboratories and started new programmes.

In 1967 Mr. E. D. Savarirayan succeeded Mr. Mathias as Headmaster of the school. He succeeded in adding to the school new Chemistry and physics laboratories.

Dr. Clement Felix became the Headmaster in 1973. He started a number of curricular and building projects. The swimming pool, the auditorium, the junior and the higher secondary hostels, NCC rooms, the Britannia Amritraj Tennis Academy, and the MRF Pace Foundation bear ample testimony to his untiring efforts to build the school to excellence. It was during his tenure that, the higher secondary course was introduced.

Dr. A. Jefferson Christopher became Headmaster in the year 1992. He upgraded the institution by setting up a computer laboratory, Junior Science lab, Basketball Court, and various other facilities.  He is good in public speaking. He was born and educated in Nazareth, Tamil Nadu, a small Christian town near Tirunelveli.

Mr. G. J. Manohar took over as the headmaster and correspondent in the year 2006. He started the nursery and primary sections, and constructed a new block to accommodate the sixth, seventh and eighth standards. He introduced innovative methods and technology into classrooms, like the Smart Board Classes. He has also revived the OBA to harness their good will and support for the expanding programmes. His initiatives include coaching classes and special classes for students, career guidance, NIE (Newspaper In Education) programme, student exchange programs (The school works with AFS and sends students to United States & Japan), Health Insurance and school mate.

School Life 
MCC School has a variety of extra-curricular activities. The school conducts cultural, Annual day, Investiture and Competition for other schools.

Students follow the Indian tradition of wishing teachers with folded hands Namaskaram position. Assembly is conducted every day to teach and train students with current affairs, Punctuality, Thirukkural, New English words, Prayer, Bible and Moral stories.

Classes run from 8 AM - 4 PM(IST) with periods of either 45 Minutes or 40 Minutes each. There are three breaks through the day after every two periods. There are also weekly physical training and art classes.

MCC has two fee structures: Aided and Self-Financed. Self-Finance is Co-Education (boys and girls) and Aided is only Boys. While studying in MCC students are called as MCCIANS.

School Traditions 
 Polishing Day - Students visit the school with the sole purpose of sanding down, and then waxing their desks. It is a day that many of the students look forward to. 
 Sports day
 School day

Clubs & Extra-curricular Activities

Clubs 
 Scripture Club
 Science Club
 Maths Club
 Science club
 English club
 Newsletter Club
 Commerce Club
 Computer Club
 Junior Red Cross Club
 Interact Club
 Music Club
 Craft Club
 Art Club
 Photography Club
 UNESCO Club
 Sports Club
 Electronic Awareness Classes
 Quiz Club
 Literary Association
 Cultural Club
 Papyrus Club
 AFS
 Library Club
 Band
 Literary Club
 Newspaper In education
 Dance Club
 Multipurpose Hall
 Swimming Pool

Uniformed services 
 NCC
 Army Wing
 Air Wing
 Navy Wing
 NSS
 RSP
 Scouts
 Guides
 Junior Red Cross

Notable alumni
 M. K. Stalin
 R. K. Narayan 
 G. K. Vasan
 T R B Rajaa
 V. Kishore Chandra Deo
 P. Chidambaram
 N.Srinivasan
 M.K. Alagiri
 Prashanth Thyagarajan
 M.K. Narayanan
 Gautham Vasudev Menon
 N. Ram
 A. R. Rahman
 Leander Paes
 Somdev Devvarman
 R. K. Krishna Kumar
 P. K. Basheer
 Venu Srinivasan
 N. Srinivasan
 A. C. Muthiah
 Vinod Raj
 Rajesh M. Selva
 Coluthur Gopalan

Faculty 

 Rev. John Anderson
 Rev. William Miller

Playground 
MCC school is well-known for the playground and infrastructure. The school has Tennis Courts, a Cricket Ground, Football & Hockey Fields, Volleyball & Basketball Courts as well as a swimming pool on campus.

Facilities 
MCC have RO water, Hostels, 2 Canteens, Clean Bathrooms, largest Playground, Visual Hall with AC, Smart Class, 2 Computer labs, 2 Physics Lab, 2 Chemistry Lab, Big Auditorium with AC, Cycle Parking, Lunch also provided for day scholar(optional), Library and more...

References

External links
 School website www.mccschool.edu.in
 Star-studded 175th b'day for MCC school - The Times of India http://timesofindia.indiatimes.com/city/chennai/Star-studded-175th-bday-for-MCC-school/articleshow/6709112.

Christian schools in Tamil Nadu
High schools and secondary schools in Chennai